Crazy for You is a Philippine primetime teleserye shown on ABS-CBN. It is the first television series about overseas Filipino workers (OFWs), followed by 2012 soap Kung Ako'y Iiwan Mo on the same network. It premiered simultaneously on ABS-CBN (Philippines) and The Filipino Channel on September 11, 2006, replacing Calla Lily, the first world launch in Philippine TV history. The show ended on December 29, 2006, three days before New Year's Day 2007 and was replaced by Sana Maulit Muli.

The show's title is taken from the 1985 Madonna pop-ballad of the same name.

Cast and characters

Main cast 
Toni Gonzaga as Janice
Luis Manzano as Wacky

Supporting cast 
John Prats as Paolo
Pokwang as Blessy
Michelle Madrigal as Sabrina
Roxanne Guinoo as Trish
Joseph Bitangcol as Jomar
Sandara Park as Ara
Gab Drilon as Lee
Valeen Montenegro as Luna
Aldred Gatchalian as Brix
Victor Basa as Errol
Rio Locsin as Melba
Sylvia Sanchez as Gigi
Dennis Padilla as Edgardo
Kristina Paner
Gloria Romero

Trivia
This was Sandara's last TV appearance when she left the Filipino show business before returning to South Korea with her family in 2007, as she was not offered to renew her contract with Star Magic as well as the first TV series to feature her and Joseph Bitangcol along with other SCQ co-teen questors Michelle Madrigal and Roxanne Guinoo without Hero Angeles who left the network in 2005 upon ended his contract of the said talent agency.

Cancelled sequel
A sequel called, Crazy for You Season 2: The Crazy Sequel, The sequel is planned to air in December 2007. However, The sequel is cancelled due to Gonzaga's recording on its upcoming fourth studio album, Love Is....

See also
List of programs broadcast by ABS-CBN
List of ABS-CBN drama series

References

External links
 

Philippine romantic comedy television series
ABS-CBN drama series
2006 Philippine television series debuts
2006 Philippine television series endings
Television shows filmed in the Philippines
Television shows filmed in Spain
Television series by Dreamscape Entertainment Television
Filipino-language television shows